Stephen Altman (born October 15, 1956) is an American production designer. He was nominated for an Academy Award in the category Best Production Design for the film Gosford Park. He is the son of American filmmaker Robert Altman.

Selected filmography 
 Gosford Park (2001; co-nominated with Anna Pinnock)

References

External links 

1956 births
Living people
People from Kansas City, Missouri
American production designers